Harold "Jack" Albertson (June 16, 1907 – November 25, 1981) was an American actor, comedian, dancer and singer who also performed in vaudeville. Albertson was a Tony, Oscar, and Emmy winning actor. For his performance as John Cleary in the 1964 play The Subject Was Roses and its 1968 film adaptation, he won the Tony Award for Best Featured Actor in a Play, and the Academy Award for Best Supporting Actor. His other roles include Grandpa Joe in Willy Wonka & the Chocolate Factory (1971), Manny Rosen in The Poseidon Adventure (1972), and Ed Brown in the television sitcom Chico and the Man (1974–1978), for which he won an Emmy. For his contributions to the television industry, Albertson was honored with a star on the Hollywood Walk of Fame in 1977 at 6253 Hollywood Boulevard.

Early life
Albertson was born on June 16, 1907, in Malden, Massachusetts, the son of Russian-Jewish immigrants Flora (née Craft) and Leopold Albertson. His older sister was actress Mabel Albertson. Their mother, a stock actress, supported the family by working in a shoe factory.  Until the age of 22, Albertson was known as "Harold Albertson". His father abandoned his mother before Jack was born, and the boy was raised by his stepfather, Alex Erlich, a barber.

During a 1972 New York Daily News interview with Sidney Fields, Albertson reminisced: Albertson dropped out of high school, ending his formal education after a single year. He worked at several different jobs including: the local General Electric plant; in one of many shoe factories in the Lynn, Massachusetts area; and as a rack boy in neighborhood pool parlors, where he was a fairly good pool hustler, although he was always on guard to avoid playing anyone who could "out-hustle" him. The pool hall provided Albertson with an opportunity to learn a few tap dance routines from his fellow hustlers.

When he was eighteen, he began to be paid for his prize winning shows. His sister Mabel taught him the first "time steps" in tap dancing, and he picked up additional routines by watching vaudeville acts that played his hometown. Around this time, he started singing with a group called "The Golden Rule Four," who held their practice sessions beneath a railroad bridge.

Career

Broadway
Albertson joined the vaudeville road troupe known as the Dancing Verselle Sisters. He then worked in burlesque as a hoofer (soft shoe dancer) and straight man to Phil Silvers on the Minsky's Burlesque Circuit. Besides vaudeville and burlesque, he appeared on the stage in many Broadway plays and musicals, including High Button Shoes, Top Banana, The Cradle Will Rock, Make Mine Manhattan, Show Boat, Boy Meets Girl, Girl Crazy, Meet the People, The Sunshine Boys – for which he received a Tony Award nomination for Best Actor, and The Subject Was Roses – for which he won a Tony for Best Supporting Actor.

Film
Albertson appeared in more than 30 films. He had an early minor role in Miracle on 34th Street as a postal worker who redirects dead letters addressed to "Santa Claus" to the courthouse where Kris Kringle is on trial. He won an Academy Award for Best Supporting Actor for his role in the 1968 film The Subject Was Roses. He later apologized to child actor and fellow nominee Jack Wild for winning the award; Albertson expected Wild to win for his role in Oliver! Also nominated was Albertson's later Willy Wonka & the Chocolate Factory co-star Gene Wilder, for his role in The Producers.

Albertson appeared as Charlie Bucket's Grandpa Joe in Willy Wonka & the Chocolate Factory (1971), and in The Poseidon Adventure (1972), where he played Manny Rosen, husband to Belle, played by Shelley Winters.

Albertson said that his one regret was that he did not reprise his role in the movie version of The Sunshine Boys. When producer Ray Stark acquired the film rights from Neil Simon in 1973, Albertson was expected to play the part, but by the time MGM had bought the rights in 1974 and was preparing to begin filming in February 1975, Albertson was not available because he was appearing on Chico and the Man on TV.

Radio
Albertson was a radio performer early in his career. Among the shows he appeared on were Just Plain Bill, Lefty, That's My Pop and The Jack Albertson Comedy Show.  In the late 1940s he was for a time a regular on the Milton Berle Show.

Television
Albertson appeared in many television series, such as Hey, Jeannie! with Jeannie Carson, the syndicated Western series Frontier Doctor with Rex Allen, Rod Cameron's syndicated crime drama State Trooper, and the 1961–1962 drama series Bus Stop. He guest-starred on the David Janssen crime-drama series Richard Diamond, Private Detective.

From 1960 to 1961, Albertson was cast in three episodes of Pete and Gladys, with Harry Morgan and Cara Williams. On January 2, 1961, Albertson was cast as Sampson J. Binton, with DeForest Kelley as Alex Jeffords, in "Listen to the Nightingale", the series finale of Riverboat, starring Darren McGavin. Albertson had a recurring role as the neighbor Walter Burton in eight episodes of the 1962 ABC sitcom Room for One More, with Andrew Duggan and Peggy McCay. He had recurring roles in Ensign O'Toole (1962–63) and Run, Buddy, Run (1966).  Between 1961 and 1964, Albertson appeared seven times on Mister Ed as Paul Fenton, brother-in-law (later just brother) to Wilbur Post's next-door-neighbor Kay, appearing as a stopgap regular for several episodes after the death of Larry Keating in 1963.

Other 1960s series on which Albertson appeared were: NBC's sitcom Happy, starring Ronnie Burns;  Glynis, starring Glynis Johns; and Keith Andes, which aired for 13 weeks in the fall of 1963. Albertson appeared in two episodes of The Twilight Zone. In a 1967 episode of The Andy Griffith Show, he played the ne'er-do-well cousin, Bradford J. Taylor, of series character Aunt Bee (Frances Bavier). He also appeared in a 1969 episode of the TV series The Virginian entitled "Girl in the Shadows." He appeared in The Big Valley episode "The Battle of Mineral Springs" (1969). In 1970, Albertson appeared as Billy "Moose" Valentine in The Men From Shiloh, the rebranded name for The Virginian in the episode titled "With Love, Bullets and Valentines".

From 1971 to 1972, he co-starred, with actor Sam Groom, in the Canadian television series Dr. Simon Locke.  He then co-starred as "The Man" Ed Brown on the popular series Chico and the Man with Freddie Prinze. He stayed for its entire run from 1974 to 1978.  He earned an Emmy Award for that role in 1976, which was his second; his first one was for an appearance on the variety show Cher in 1975.

Personal life and death
He resided for many years in West Hollywood, California. In 1978, he was diagnosed with colorectal cancer, but kept this information private and continued to act. Two of his last roles were in the television movies, My Body, My Child (1982) and Grandpa, Will You Run with Me? (1983), both filmed in 1981 and released posthumously. His final theatrical role was as the  hunter, Amos Slade, in Disney's 24th animated feature, The Fox and the Hound, originally released in the summer of 1981, four months before his death.

He and his wife, June, had a daughter, Maura Dhu. On the morning of November 25, 1981, Albertson died at his Los Angeles home in the Hollywood Hills at the age of 74 from colon cancer. He and his elder sister, Bewitched actress Mabel Albertson (who died ten months later from Alzheimer's disease), were cremated and their ashes were scattered in the Pacific Ocean.

Filmography

Film

Television

See also 

 List of people who have won Academy, Emmy, Grammy, and Tony Awards

References

External links

 
 Jack Alberston on TCM.com
 
 
 

1907 births
1981 deaths
20th-century American male actors
American male dancers
American male film actors
American male musical theatre actors
American male stage actors
American male television actors
American people of Russian-Jewish descent
Jewish American male comedians
Best Supporting Actor Academy Award winners
Deaths from cancer in California
Deaths from colorectal cancer
Jewish American male actors
Jewish male comedians
Jewish singers
Male actors from Massachusetts
Outstanding Performance by a Lead Actor in a Comedy Series Primetime Emmy Award winners
People from Malden, Massachusetts
Tony Award winners
Vaudeville performers
20th-century American comedians
20th-century American dancers
20th-century American male singers
20th-century American singers
20th-century American Jews